This list of titles and honours of the British monarch details the current and former titles of the sovereign of the United Kingdom of Great Britain and Northern Ireland, and its predecessor states.

The present United Kingdom was formed in 1922 when the United Kingdom of Great Britain and Ireland, which had been formed in 1801 from the Kingdom of Great Britain and the Kingdom of Ireland, was partitioned to create the Irish Free State. The Kingdom of Great Britain was itself formed in 1707 from the Kingdom of England and the Kingdom of Scotland. England and Scotland had been in a personal union since 1603, while Ireland had been in a personal union with the Kingdom of England since the elevation of the Lordship of Ireland to the status of a kingdom in 1542. Wales was gradually conquered by England in the Middle Ages, beginning with the Norman invasion of Wales and concluding with the conquests of Edward I in 1277–83. Wales was legally incorporated into England between 1535 and 1542 by King Henry VIII.

The medieval monarchs of England also controlled large parts of France, particularly under the Angevin kings. Several of the listed titles are therefore French, many held as fiefs of the French Crown rather than independently. Also represented is the English claim to the France, maintained for over 400 years before being dropped after the French Revolution.

While the English claim to France was not seriously pursued after the Middle Ages, later monarchs did hold foreign titles. When William III became King alongside his wife Mary II, he maintained his Dutch titles. The Georgian kings ruled as Electors and Kings of Hanover, as well as holding the office of Arch-Treasurer of the Holy Roman Empire. These titles lapsed when Queen Victoria succeeded to the throne.

While the British Empire only gave the monarch one significant new title, that of Emperor of India, its transformation into the Commonwealth of Nations and decolonisation created many new independent states, each with a separate monarchy. Of the thirty-two realms Elizabeth II became queen of on her accession in 1952, only sixteen retain her as their monarch. All current and former Commonwealth realms are listed below.

Titles held by the monarch of the United Kingdom

Kingdoms 

 King/Queen of the United Kingdom of Great Britain and Northern Ireland (from 1927 to present only)

Lordships 

 Lord of Mann

Non-hereditary titles 
 Head of the Commonwealth (from 1949 to present only)

Religious titles 
 Defender of the Faith — granted by Pope Leo X to Henry VIII for his book Defense of the Seven Sacraments, and revoked in 1530 at the beginning of the English Reformation.

Commonwealth realms 
These kingdoms are independent of the British Crown, but are held in personal union with the United Kingdom and follow the same rules of succession.

Customary titles 
These titles are used by custom in their respective areas, but are not formally held by the monarch.

Titles formerly held by British monarchs 
The following titles include those held by the monarchs of the predecessor kingdoms to the United Kingdom, and titles formerly used but now abolished.

Kingdoms, empires and equivalent

Principalities

Duchies

Electorates 

  Elector of Brunswick-Lüneburg — held by the Kings of Great Britain / the United Kingdom from 1714 to 1807. Merged into the Kingdom of Westphalia during the Napoleonic Wars and re-established as the Kingdom of Hanover in 1814.

Counties 
 Count of Anjou — held from the King of France by Henry II, Richard I, and John, Kings of England.
 Count of Ponthieu— held from the King of France by Edward II and Edward III. Inherited from Eleanor of Castile, wife of Edward I.
 Count of Boulogne — held by Stephen.

Lordships 

  Lord of Ireland — used by the Kings of England between 1171 and 1542 to signify their sovereignty over parts of Ireland. Elevated to a Kingdom in 1542.

Religious titles 
 Supreme Head of the Church of England — title used by Henry VIII and Edward VI to reflect their status as head of the English Church.

Offices of the Holy Roman Empire 
 Arch-Treasurer 
 Prince-Elector

Commonwealth realms 

These Kingdoms were independent of the British Crown, but were held in personal union with the United Kingdom and followed the same rules of succession. Monarchies listed under 'Queen' only had Elizabeth II as their sovereign, and thus never had a reigning king. Dates indicate the year the monarchy was formed and the year of its dissolution.

 Monarch of the Irish Free State/Ireland — 1931-37 (in practice), -1949 (legally)
 Queen of Ceylon — 1948-72
 King of India — 1947-1950
 Queen of Fiji — 1970-87
 Queen of the Gambia — 1965-70
 Queen of Ghana — 1957-60
 Queen of Guyana — 1966-70
 Queen of Kenya — 1963-4
 Queen of Malawi — 1964-6
 Queen of Malta — 1964-74
 Queen of Mauritius —1968-92
 Queen of Nigeria — 1960-63
 Queen of Pakistan — 1947-56
 Queen of Sierra Leone — 1961-71
 Queen of South Africa — 1931-61
 Queen of Tanganyika — 1961-62
 Queen of Trinidad and Tobago — 1962-76
 Queen of Uganda — 1962-3
 Queen of Barbados — 1966-2021

See also
 Prince of Wales#Other titles

References 

Titles
Historic titles of British monarchs